The Restaurant may refer to:

 The Restaurant (British TV series), a BBC Two series, featuring Raymond Blanc
 The Restaurant (British series 1) (2007), the first series of the above
 The Restaurant (British series 2) (2008), the second series of the above
 The Restaurant (British series 3) (2009), the third series of the above
 Vår tid är nu, or The Restaurant in English, a Swedish television series 
 The Restaurant (American TV series) (2003–2004)
 The Restaurant (Irish TV series), an RTÉ television series featuring celebrity head chefs each week

See also
 Restaurant (disambiguation)